Gledzianów  is a village in the administrative district of Gmina Witonia, within Łęczyca County, Łódź Voivodeship, in central Poland.

References

Villages in Łęczyca County